Bibia is a municipality in the Amuru District of the Northern Region of Uganda.

Location
Bibia is in the Acholi sub-region of the Northern Region. The coordinates of Bibia are 3°28'26.0"N, 32°04'04.0"E (Latitude:3.4739; Longitude:32.0678).

Overview
Bibia is a market town and the second human settlement, after the border town of Elegu, on the Gulu–Nimule Road that enters Uganda from South Sudan. , Bibia was a small but growing town, whose infrastructure was still in its infancy.

See also 
 Acholi people
 List of cities and towns in Uganda
 List of roads in Uganda

References 

Amuru District
Populated places in Northern Region, Uganda
Cities in the Great Rift Valley